The tetrasporaphyte is a phase in the life history of algae which bear tetrasporangia. This phase is usually morphologically similar to the gametophyte phase.

References

Algae